Ömer Cerrahoğlu (born 3 May 1995) is a Romanian child prodigy in mathematics.

Early life and education 
He was born in Istanbul, Turkey to a Romanian mother and a Turkish father and when he was five years old, he moved with his family to Baia Mare, Romania. He graduated from the Massachusetts Institute of Technology (MIT) in June 2018, where he studied computer science.

Career 
In 2017, he participated in the 78th William Lowell Putnam Mathematical Competition as a student of MIT and earned a Putnam Fellowship. Since his victory in 2009, he won three more silver medals at the 2010, 2011 and 2013 IMO's missing the gold by only 1, 2 and 1 points, respectively, and one more gold medal at the IMO 2012 in Argentina.

See also
List of child prodigies
List of International Mathematical Olympiad participants

References

External links

1995 births
Living people
International Mathematical Olympiad participants
Romanian people of Turkish descent
Romanian Muslims
Romanian expatriates in the United States
Putnam Fellows